Chak Sunda is a village in Harchandpur block of Rae Bareli district, Uttar Pradesh, India. As of 2011, its population is 1,223, in 204 households. It has one primary school and no healthcare facilities.

The 1961 census recorded Chak Sunda as comprising 3 hamlets, with a total population of 594 people (306 male and 288 female), in 103 households and 103 physical houses. The area of the village was given as 279 acres.

The 1981 census recorded Chak Sunda as having a population of 838 people, in 123 households, and having an area of 105.63 hectares.

References

Villages in Raebareli district